Gherkin is a common name for a pickled cucumber, especially in British English. 

Gherkin may also refer to:

Plants 
 , a common name for these varieties of Cucumis sativus which are typically grown as a field crop and produce small fruits, which are usually pickled
 Cucumis anguria, commonly known as "bur gherkin" or "West Indian gherkin", usually pickled
 Melothria scabra, commonly known as "Mexican sour gherkin", usually pickled

Other 
 30 St Mary Axe, a skyscraper in London, commonly known as "the Gherkin"
 , a language used in the Cucumber software tool to define test cases

See also 
 Gerkin (disambiguation)
 Jerkin